SATS may refer to:

Transportation
 SATS (company)
 SATS Security Services
 Small Aircraft Transportation System
 Stansted Airport Transit System

Other uses
 Blood oxygen saturation, known as "sats"
 South African Theological Seminary
 National Curriculum assessment, in the UK, colloquially known as Sats or SATs
 Sats, short for satoshis, a unit of a Bitcoin equivalent to 0.00000001

See also
 SAT (disambiguation)
 Superman: The Animated Series (STAS)